{{DISPLAYTITLE:C9H13N}}
The molecular formula C9H13N may refer to:
 Dimethylbenzylamine
 Methylphenethylamines
 Amphetamine (Benzedrine, Adderall)
 Dextroamphetamine
 Levoamphetamine
 β-Methylphenethylamine
 N-Methylphenethylamine
 2-Methylphenethylamine
 3-Methylphenethylamine
 4-Methylphenethylamine
 2,4,6-Trimethylaniline